Derek Lewis may refer to:
 Derek Lewis (footballer)
 Derek Lewis (prison governor)

See also
 Derrick Lewis (disambiguation)